The 2022 Delaware House of Representatives elections took place on November 8, 2022, as part of the 2022 United States elections. Delaware voters elected state senators in all 41 of the state's Senate districts. 41 State Representatives serve four-year terms in the Delaware House of Representatives.

A primary election on September 13, 2022, determined which candidates appear on the November 8 general election ballot. Primary election results can be obtained from the Delaware Secretary of State's website.

Following the 2020 state House of Representatives elections, Democrats maintained effective control of the House with Democrats have a majority with 26 members. Republicans hold 15 seats following the 2020 elections.

Background

Retirements

Republicans

Democrats

Incumbents defeated

In primary elections

Republicans

Democrats

Predictions

Results

† - Incumbent not seeking re-election

Closest races 
Seats where the margin of victory was under 10%:
 
  gain

Detailed results

District 1 
2nd term incumbent Democratic Representative Nnamdi Chukwuocha has represented Delaware House of Representatives 1st District since November 2018.

District 2 
6th term incumbent Democratic Representative Stephanie Bolden has represented Delaware House of Representatives 2nd District since November 2010.

Stephanie Bolden

District 3 
2nd term incumbent Democratic Representative Sherry Dorsey Walker has represented Delaware House of Representatives 3rd District since November 2018.

District 4 
8th term incumbent Democratic Representative Gerald Brady has represented Delaware House of Representatives 4th District since November 2006. He resigned in February 2022

District 5 
2nd term incumbent Democratic Representative Kendra Johnson has represented Delaware House of Representatives 5th District since November 2018.

District 6 
6th term incumbent Democratic Representative Debra Heffernan has represented Delaware House of Representatives 6th District since November 2018.

District 7 
1st term incumbent Democratic Representative Larry Lambert has represented Delaware House of Representatives 7th District since November 2020.

District 8 
1st term incumbent Democratic Representative Sherae'a Moore has represented Delaware House of Representatives 8th District since November 2020.

District 9 
4th term incumbent Republican Representative Kevin Hensley has represented Delaware House of Representatives 9th District since November 2014.

District 10 
4th term incumbent Democratic Representative Sean Matthews has represented Delaware House of Representatives 10th District since November 2014.

District 11 
5th term incumbent Republican Representative Jeffrey Spiegelman has represented Delaware House of Representatives 11th District since November 2012.

District 12 
2nd term incumbent Democratic Representative Krista Griffith has represented Delaware House of Representatives 12th District since November 2018.

District 13 
8th term incumbent Democratic Representative John Mitchell Jr. has represented Delaware House of Representatives 13th District since November 2006.

District 14 
10th term incumbent Democratic Representative Peter Schwartzkopf has represented Delaware House of Representatives 14th District since November 2002.

District 15 
9th term incumbent Democratic Representative Valerie Longhurst has represented Delaware House of Representatives 15th District since November 2004. He represented House majority Leader since 2013.

District 16 
2nd term incumbent Democratic Representative Franklin Cooke Jr. has represented Delaware House of Representatives 16th District since November 2018.

District 17 
2nd term incumbent Democratic Representative Melissa Minor-Brown has represented Delaware House of Representatives 17th District since November 2018.

District 18 
4th term incumbent Democratic Representative David Bentz has represented Delaware House of Representatives 17th District since 2015.

District 19 
5th term incumbent Democratic Representative Kimberly Williams has represented Delaware House of Representatives 19th District since November 2012.

District 20 
5th term incumbent Republican Representative Stephen Smyk has represented Delaware House of Representatives 20th District since November 2012.

District 21 
7th term incumbent Republican Representative Michael Ramone has represented Delaware House of Representatives 21st District since November 2008.

District 22 
2nd term incumbent Republican Representative Michael F. Smith has represented Delaware House of Representatives 22nd District since November 2018.

District 23 
5th term incumbent Democratic Representative Paul Baumbach has represented Delaware House of Representatives 23rd District since November 2012.

District 24 
6th term incumbent Democratic Representative Edward Osienski has represented Delaware House of Representatives 24th District since November 2010.

District 25 
8th term incumbent Democratic Representative John Kowalko has represented Delaware House of Representatives 25th District since November 2006.

District 26 
1st term incumbent Democratic Representative Madinah Wilson-Anton has represented Delaware House of Representatives 26th District since November 2020.

District 27 
1st term incumbent Democratic Representative Eric Morrison has represented Delaware House of Representatives 27th District since November 2020. He is running for reelection.

District 28 
7th term incumbent Democratic Representative William Carson Jr has represented Delaware House of Representatives 28th District since November 2008.

District 29 
2nd term incumbent Democratic Representative William Bush IV has represented Delaware House of Representatives 29th District since November 2018.

District 30 
2nd term incumbent Republican Representative W. Shannon Morris has represented Delaware House of Representatives 30th District since November 2018.

District 31 
4th term incumbent Democratic Representative Sean Lynn has represented Delaware House of Representatives 31st District since November 2014.

District 32 
5th term incumbent Democratic Representative Andria Bennett has represented Delaware House of Representatives 32nd District since November 2012.

District 33 
3rd term incumbent Republican Representative Charles Postles Jr. has represented Delaware House of Representatives 33rd District since November 2016.

District 34 
4th term incumbent Republican Representative Lyndon Yearick has represented Delaware House of Representatives 34th District since November 2014.

District 35 
2nd term incumbent Republican Representative Jesse Vanderwende has represented Delaware House of Representatives 35th District since November 2018.

District 36 
2nd term incumbent Republican Representative Bryan Shupe has represented Delaware House of Representatives 36th District since November 2018.

District 37 
6th term incumbent Republican Representative Ruth Briggs King has represented Delaware House of Representatives 37th District since January 2010.

District 38 
5th term incumbent Republican Representative Ronald E. Gray has represented Delaware House of Representatives 38th District since November 2012.

District 39 
8th term incumbent Republican Representative Daniel Short has represented Delaware House of Representatives 39th District since November 2006. He represented as House Minority Leader sine 2013.

District 40 
5th term incumbent Republican Representative Timothy Dukes has represented Delaware House of Representatives 40th District since November 2012.

District 41 
4th term incumbent Republican Representative Richard G. Collins has represented Delaware House of Representatives 41st District since November 2014.

Predictions

References

External links

House of Representatives
Delaware House of Representatives elections
Delaware House of Representatives